John R. Richardson (born 24 June 1873, date of death unknown) was a South African tennis player. He competed in the men's singles event at the 1908 Summer Olympics.

References

External links
 

1873 births
Year of death missing
South African male tennis players
Olympic tennis players of South Africa
Tennis players at the 1908 Summer Olympics
People from Antananarivo
Emigrants from Madagascar to South Africa